East Waterford was a United Kingdom Parliament constituency in Ireland, returning one Member of Parliament from 1885 to 1918.

Prior to the 1885 United Kingdom general election and after the dissolution of Parliament in 1918 the area was part of the County Waterford constituency.

Boundaries
This constituency comprised the eastern part of County Waterford. It included the baronies of Gaultiere, Glenahiry, Middlethird, and Upperthird, and that part of the barony of Decies-without-Drum contained within the parishes of Ballylaneen, Clonea (excluding the townlands of Ballyrandle and Kilgrovan), Fews, Kilbarrymeaden, Kilrossanty, Monksland, Rossmire and Stradbally, and the townland of Lishane in the parish of Newcastle.

Members of Parliament

Elections

Elections in the 1880s

Elections in the 1890s

Elections in the 1900s

Elections in the 1910s

Power's death causes a by-election.

References

Westminster constituencies in County Waterford (historic)
Constituencies of the Parliament of the United Kingdom established in 1885
Constituencies of the Parliament of the United Kingdom disestablished in 1918